The Men's 4 x 400 metres relay event  at the 2007 European Athletics Indoor Championships was held on March 4. Germany were originally awarded the gold medal, however, on an appeal by the Russian team, were disqualified for pushing, meaning the gold medal went to Great Britain and NI.

Results

References
Results

4 × 400 metres relay at the European Athletics Indoor Championships
400